Metropolitan River Protection Act (Georgia Code 12-5-440 et seq.) was enacted in 1973 by the Georgia General Assembly to establish a 2000-foot Corridor along the banks of the Chattahoochee River and its impoundments for the 48 miles between Buford Dam and Peachtree Creek.

History
Enacted in 1973, the Metropolitan River Protection Act initially covered a 48-mile corridor between Buford Dam (on the north) and Peachtree Creek, to the south. In 1998, the Act was amended to extend the corridor an additional 36 miles to the downstream limits of Fulton and Douglas Counties.

Atlanta Regional Commission
The Act requires the Atlanta Regional Commission (ARC) to adopt a plan to protect the Chattahoochee River corridor and to review development proposals for consistency with the plan.  Local governments along the corridor are required to implement the plan by issuing permits based on ARC findings, monitoring land-disturbing activity in the corridor and enforcing the Act and the plan. Under the Act, land-disturbing activity in the corridor must comply with the adopted plan to be legal.

References

External links
 Metropolitan River Protection Act & Chattahoochee Corridor Plan
 Metropolitan River Protection Act
 Chattahoochee Corridor Plan Summary
 Chattahoochee Corridor Plan (PDF)
 Review Process Overview

Chattahoochee River
1973 in law
1973 in Georgia (U.S. state)
Georgia (U.S. state) statutes
Environmental protection